Antwan—a variant of the French name Antoine—is a male given name commonly used among African Americans. Notable people with this name include the following.

Antwan Barnes
Antwan Odom
Antwan Patton, rapper known as Big Boi
Antwan Peek
Ant Wan, Swedish rapper

See also

Antawn Jamison
Antoan, given name
Antuan, given name
Antwain, given name
Antwaun, given name
Antwuan, given name

Notes

African-American given names